The 1985 ECAC South men's basketball tournament (known as the Colonial Athletic Association men's basketball tournament from 1986) was held March 7–9 at William & Mary Hall in Williamsburg, Virginia. 

Navy defeated  in the championship game, 85–76, to win their first ECAC South men's basketball tournament. The Midshipmen, therefore, earn an automatic bid to the 1985 NCAA tournament. This was Navy's first NCAA tournament appearance since 1960.

This was the first ECAC South (CAA) Tournament for American and UNC Wilmington.

Bracket

References

Colonial Athletic Association men's basketball tournament
Tournament
ECAC South men's basketball tournament
ECAC South men's basketball tournament
Sports competitions in Virginia
Basketball in Virginia